Pradip Bhattacharya (born 24 January 1945) is an Indian politician. He is a member of the Rajya Sabha from the state of West Bengal, representing Indian National Congress.

He had studied B.A. with honors at SURI Vidyasagar College, M.A. at Burdwan University in West Bengal. Earlier he had studied at Itagoria High School.

References

1945 births
Living people
Indian National Congress politicians from West Bengal
Rajya Sabha members from West Bengal
Politicians from Kolkata
India MPs 1996–1997
People from Hooghly district